USS Peerless (AMc-93) was an Accentor-class coastal minesweeper acquired by the U.S. Navy for the dangerous task of removing mines from minefields laid in the water to prevent ships from passing.

Peerless was laid down 14 April 1941 by Delaware Bay Shipbuilding Co., Leesburg, New Jersey, launched 9 August 1941 and was placed in service 19 February 1942.

World War II service 
The new coastal minesweeper got underway 19 March and trained in Chesapeake Bay out of Yorktown, Virginia. Arriving Guantanamo Bay, Cuba, 23 April, Peerless operated in the Caribbean throughout World War II performing minesweeping and inshore patrol duties. The minesweeper was placed out of service and transferred to the War Department at Norfolk, Virginia, 18 March 1946. Peerless was struck from the List of District Craft 28 March 1946.

References

External links 
 NavSource Online: Mine Warfare Vessel Photo Archive - Peerless (AMc 93)

 

Accentor-class minesweepers
Ships built in Leesburg, New Jersey
1941 ships
World War II minesweepers of the United States